Cancer Medicine is a monthly peer-reviewed open-access medical journal covering oncology. It was established in 2012 and is published by John Wiley & Sons. The editor-in-chief is Stephen Tait (Institute of Cancer Sciences, University of Glasgow). According to the Journal Citation Reports, the journal has a 2020 impact factor of 4.452.

References

External links

Oncology journals
Publications established in 2012
Open access journals
Wiley (publisher) academic journals
Monthly journals
English-language journals